David Kopřiva (born 18 October 1979, in Prague) is a Czech rower.

References
 
 sports-reference.com

1979 births
Living people
Czech male rowers
Rowers from Prague
Olympic silver medalists for the Czech Republic
Rowers at the 2004 Summer Olympics
Olympic medalists in rowing
Medalists at the 2004 Summer Olympics
World Rowing Championships medalists for the Czech Republic